Todd Mervyn Betts (born June 24, 1973) is a Canadian former professional baseball first baseman and a third baseman.

Career
The Cleveland Indians chose Betts in the fourteen round in the 1993  Major League Baseball draft.

He later played with the Brantford Red Sox in the Ontario, Canada, Intercounty Baseball League.

In 2003, he played for Yakult Swallows in the Nippon Professional Baseball (NPB). After the 2003 season, he became a free agent.

In 2004, he played for New York Yankees organization. During the 2004 season, he was selected for Canada national baseball team at the 2004 Summer Olympics. Canada finished in fourth place.

He later signed with the La New Bears of the Chinese Professional Baseball League (CPBL) in early 2006 and played with that team until July 2006. As of May 2006, Betts held the highest batting average and RBI in the league. However his performance slumped after he suffered vertebra injuries in June after which La New Bears ended his contract in July 2006.

On July 25, 2007, he signed a contract with the Edmonton Cracker-Cats, hitting .275 with 1 home run in 33 games.

He next began his coaching career in 2008 between Team Canada and the Ontario Prospects helping develop professional hitters yearly before moving to the Ontario Blue Jays and Toronto Mets.

When he ended his active professional baseball career, he founded his own company, 4 Corners Elite Development, which helps children improve their overall skills.  ((https://fourcornerselite.com/))

References

External links

1973 births
Living people
Akron Aeros players
Baseball players from Toronto
Baseball players at the 1999 Pan American Games
Baseball players at the 2004 Summer Olympics
Buffalo Bisons (minor league) players
Burlington Indians players (1986–2006)
Calgary Cannons players
Canadian baseball coaches
Canadian expatriate baseball players in Japan
Canadian expatriate baseball players in Taiwan
Canadian expatriate baseball players in the United States
Canton-Akron Indians players
Columbus Clippers players
Edmonton Cracker-Cats players
Kinston Indians players
La New Bears players
Nippon Professional Baseball first basemen
Northeastern Oklahoma A&M Golden Norsemen baseball players
Olympic baseball players of Canada
Pan American Games bronze medalists for Canada
Pan American Games medalists in baseball
Pawtucket Red Sox players
People from East York, Toronto
Portland Sea Dogs players
Somerset Patriots players
Tacoma Rainiers players
Watertown Indians players
Yakult Swallows players
Medalists at the 1999 Pan American Games